John Oddo (Née John Frank Oddo; March 21, 1953 – April 2, 2019) was an American jazz pianist, composer, and arranger.  He is most notably associated as pianist and musical director for Woody Herman, Rosemary Clooney and Michael Feinstein.

Early life
John Oddo was born in Brooklyn, New York on March 21, 1953.   He studied piano as a child and would eventually graduate from the Eastman School of Music with a master's degree in Jazz Studies in 1978.

Career

Woody Herman's Young Thundering Herd

By 1980 the pipeline of young musicians coming out of the Eastman School of Music had become a strong stream of young jazz artists for Woody Herman's big band.  Recently graduated from Eastman, on July 6 of 1980 Oddo joined the Herman organization along with John Fedchock, Steve Harrow and Mike Brignola.   Oddo would quickly become a star in the long line of pianists/arrangers for Herman dating back to Ralph Burns, Nat Pierce and Alan Broadbent; he would serve as the band's primary arranger 1980-1984.   Two notable albums with Concord Records were produced during this time featuring Oddo as both pianist and musical arranger/director: The Woody Herman Big Band Live at the Concord Jazz Festival (1981) and World Class (1982, live from Osaka, Japan).   Both of these Concord releases would go on to earn Grammy Award nominations in 1982 and 1984 for Best Jazz Performance – Large Group (Instrumental).  John Oddo has become synonymous with the long list of notable Herman composers and arrangers to include names such as Johnny Mandel, Bill Holman, Shorty Rogers, Jimmy Guiffre and others.

Rosemary Clooney

In August 1983, Woody Herman recorded the album My Buddy featuring Rosemary Clooney on the Concord Records label.  Carl Jefferson (CEO with Concord) urged the collaboration as both Clooney and Herman were on contract with his label at the time; this being her eighth and his sixth release with Concord.  John Oddo served as the arranger and musical director of the project having been serving in that role for the Herman band for the previous two and a half years.  Three new arrangements (of Oddo's seven) were literally produced overnight by him for the new project.     The album is the start of a long, 18-year association of Oddo becoming Clooney's musical director; the musical architect of her resurgence in popularity.  His credits include work on 20 of her recordings, as well as numerous live and televised performances.

Michael Feinstein

Oddo was a longtime collaborator with Michael Feinstein as both music director and arranger, and received a Drama Desk Award nomination for his orchestrations for Feinstein and Dame Edna Everage's 2010 Broadway show, All About Me.    Oddo was also musical director for Feinstein's PBS specials, Michael Feinstein at the Rainbow Room and Michael Feinstein New Year's Eve at the Rainbow Room.  Starting in 2010, Oddo appeared and is heard on numerous episodes of Michael Feinstein's PBS series American Songbook.

Further work

Over his career, John Oddo became the "go-to guy" for an arrangement, orchestration or backing singers in the New York entertainment circles for regular engagements, Broadway and broadcast media to include the famous Algonquin Hotel Oak Room. In the early 1980s Oddo worked for the group Dameronia helping to transcribe and recreate the music of Tadd Dameron for concerts and three notable recordings.   As musical director, arranger and pianist Oddo's musical collaborators over the years have included Debby Boone, Stan Getz, Patti Austin, Joe Williams, Christine Ebersole, Melissa Errico, Tony Bennett, Ray Charles,  Bob Hope, Toni Tennille, Maureen McGovern, David Hyde Pierce, Linda Ronstadt, John Pizzarelli, and Steve Tyrell.  He served as musical director and arranger for James Naughtons production Street of Dreams in 1998 and PBS "Live from Lincoln Center" presents James Naughton: The Songs of Randy Newman.  Other notable projects included composer and performer for the 2003 PBS/Showtime Our Town directed by James Naughton.  He served as, conductor, pianist, and arranger for the NBC special Scott Hamilton & Friends. Oddo has performed at the White House for four presidents.  From 2015 to 2019 Oddo served as the musical director, arranger and pianist for Tony Danza's cabaret show, Standards & Stories.

Personal life
John Oddo died suddenly at his home in White Plains, New York, on April 2, 2019.

Discography

With Debby Boone

 2005: Reflections of Rosemary (Concord)

With Rosemary Clooney

 1984  Rosemary Clooney Sings the Music of Irving Berlin (Concord)
 1985  Rosemary Clooney Sings Ballads (Concord)
 1986  Rosemary Clooney Sings the Music of Jimmy Van Heusen (Concord)
 1987  Rosemary Clooney Sings the Lyrics of Johnny Mercer (Concord)
 1989  Show Tunes (Concord)
 1990  Rosemary Clooney Sings Rodgers, Hart & Hammerstein (Concord)
 1991  For the Duration (Concord)
 1992  Girl Singer (Concord)
 1993  Do You Miss New York? (Concord)
 1994  Still on the Road (Concord)
 1995  Demi-Centennial (Concord)
 1996  Dedicated to Nelson (Concord)
 1996  White Christmas
 1997  Mothers & Daughters
 1998  At Long Last (with the Count Basie Orchestra)
 2000  Brazil (with John Pizzarelli)
 2001  Sentimental Journey: The Girl Singer and Her New Big Band
 2002  The Last Concert (live)
 2008  Sings for Lovers (Concord)

With Dameronia

1982 To Tadd with Love (Uptown)
1983 Look Stop Listen (Uptown) 
1989 Live at the Theatre Boulogne (Soul Note)

With Melissa Errico

 2018 Sondheim Sublime (Ghostlight Records)

With Oleg Frish

 2015 	Duets with My American Idols

With Michael Feinstein

 2000 Romance on Film, Romance on Broadway (Concord)
 2002 The Michael Feinstein Anthology
 2009 The Power of Two
 2011 We Dreamed These Days
 2011 Cheek to Cheek: Cook and Feinstein

With Woody Herman

 1982 Live at the Concord Jazz Festival (Concord)
 1983 My Buddy (Concord) 
 1984 World Class (Concord)
 2002 From East to West (Concord) - two album set
 2004/1981 Live in Chicago

With Maureen McGovern

 1996: Out of This World

With Rosie O'Donnell

 1999 A Rosie Christmas

With Laura Osnes

 2016  Hallelujah!

With Richard Stoltzman

 1991 Ebony (RCA)

With Steve Tyrell

 2013 It's Magic: The Songs of Sammy Cahn (Concord)

With Rufus Wainwright

 2007 Rufus Does Judy at Carnegie Hall (Geffen)

With Tom Wopat

 2011 Consider It Swung 
 2012 I've Got Your Number
 2014 Home For Christmas (Distribution 13)

Film and television
Michael Feinstein in Concert (1989)
Golden Anniversary (1995) 
Our Town (2003)
An Evening with Scott Hamilton & Friends (2004)  
Michael Feinstein at the Rainbow Room (2014)
"Live from Lincoln Center": James Naughton: The Songs of Randy Newman (2014)

Awards and nominations

See also
 List of jazz arrangers

References

External links
 
 

Jazz arrangers
Eastman School of Music alumni
American jazz pianists
American male pianists
1953 births
2019 deaths
American male composers
20th-century American pianists
20th-century American composers
20th-century American male musicians
American male jazz musicians
Musicians from Brooklyn
Jazz musicians from New York (state)